Hallberg or Hållberg is a Swedish surname. Notable people with the surname include:

Anders Hallberg (born 1945), Swedish chemist
Axel Hallberg (born 1999), Swedish politician
Bengt Hallberg (1932–2013), Swedish jazz musician
Bob Hallberg (1944–2019), American basketball coach
David Hallberg, American ballet dancer
Ernst Hallberg (1894–1944), Swedish equestrian
Garth Risk Hallberg (born 1978), American author
Gary Hallberg (born 1958), American golfer
Gösta Hallberg (1891–1978), Swedish high jumper
Knut Hallberg, Swedish football manager
Mark Hallberg (born 1985), American baseball coach
Melker Hallberg (born 1995), Swedish footballer
Nils Hallberg (1921–2010), Swedish actor
Olle Hallberg (1903–1996), Swedish track athlete 
Per Hallberg (born 1958), Swedish sound editor
Per Hållberg (born 1978), Swedish ice hockey player
Sture Hållberg (1917–1988), Swedish boxer

See also
 Halberg (disambiguation)
 Hallsberg
 Hallsburg

Swedish-language surnames